Bente Stein Mathisen (born 1 February 1956) is a Norwegian politician for the Conservative Party.

She served as a deputy representative to the Parliament of Norway from Akershus during the term 2009–2013, and in 2013 she was elected as a full member of Parliament. She served as a member of the Standing Committee on Labour and Social Affairs. She has been a member of Asker municipal council from 1992 to 2003 and Akershus county council from 2003 to 2015.

References

1956 births
Living people
Members of the Storting
Conservative Party (Norway) politicians
Asker politicians
Women members of the Storting
21st-century Norwegian politicians
21st-century Norwegian women politicians